James Logan Jones Jr. (born December 19, 1943) is a retired United States Marine Corps four-star general and consultant who served as the 21st United States National Security Advisor from 2009 to 2010. During his military career, he served as the 32nd Commandant of the Marine Corps from July 1999 to January 2003, and Commander, United States European Command and Supreme Allied Commander Europe from 2003 to 2006. Jones retired from the Marine Corps on February 1, 2007, after 40 years of service.

After retiring from the Marine Corps, Jones remained involved in national security and foreign policy issues. In 2007, Jones served as chairman of the Congressional Independent Commission on the Security Forces of Iraq, which investigated the capabilities of the Iraqi police and armed forces. In November 2007, he was appointed by the U.S. Secretary of State as special envoy for Middle East security. He served as chairman of the Atlantic Council from June 2007 to January 2009, when he assumed the post of National Security Advisor which he held until November 2010.

Jones owns the consulting firms Ironhand Security LLC and Jones Group International LLC. He has worked as a paid adviser to the Saudi government.

Early life and education
Jones was born in Kansas City, Missouri, on December 19, 1943. He is the son of Charlotte Ann (née Ground) and James L. Jones Sr., a decorated Marine in World War II who was an officer in the Observer Group and the commanding officer of its successor, the Amphibious Reconnaissance Battalion. Having spent his formative years in France, where he attended the American School of Paris, he returned to the United States, graduating from Groveton High School in Fairfax County, Virginia, then attended Georgetown University Edmund A. Walsh School of Foreign Service, from which he received a Bachelor of Science degree in 1966.

Military career

In January 1967, Jones was commissioned a second lieutenant in the United States Marine Corps. Upon completion of The Basic School at Marine Corps Base Quantico, Virginia, in October 1967, he was ordered to South Vietnam, where he served as a platoon and company commander with Golf Company, 2nd Battalion, 3rd Marines. While overseas, he was promoted to first lieutenant in June 1968.

Returning to the United States in December 1968, Jones was assigned to Marine Corps Base Camp Pendleton, California, where he served as a company commander until May 1970. He then received orders to Marine Barracks, Washington, D.C., for duties as a company commander, serving in this assignment until July 1973. While at this post, he was promoted to captain in December 1970. From July 1973 until June 1974, he was a student at the Amphibious Warfare School, Marine Corps University, Marine Corps Base Quantico, Virginia.

In November 1974, Jones received orders to report to the 3rd Marine Division at Marine Corps Base Camp Smedley D. Butler, Okinawa, Japan, where he served as the commander of Company H, 2nd Battalion, 9th Marines, until December 1975.

From January 1976 to August 1979, Jones served in the Officer Assignments Section at Headquarters Marine Corps, Washington, D.C. During this assignment, he was promoted to major in July 1977. Remaining in Washington, his next assignment was as the Marine Corps liaison officer to the United States Senate, where he served until July 1984. In this assignment, his first commander was John McCain, then a United States Navy captain. He was promoted to lieutenant colonel in September 1982.

Senior staff and command

Jones was selected to attend the National War College in Washington, D.C. Following graduation in June 1985, he was assigned to command the 3rd Battalion, 9th Marines, 1st Marine Division, at Camp Pendleton, California, from July 1985 to July 1987.

In August 1987, Jones returned to Headquarters Marine Corps, where he served as senior aide to the Commandant of the Marine Corps. He was promoted to colonel in April 1988, and became the Military Secretary to the Commandant of the Marine Corps in February 1989. During August 1990, Jones was assigned as the commanding officer of the 24th Marine Expeditionary Unit (24th MEU) at Marine Corps Base Camp Lejeune, North Carolina.

During his tour with the 24th MEU, Jones participated in Operation Provide Comfort in Northern Iraq and Turkey. He was advanced to brigadier general on April 23, 1992. Jones was assigned to duties as deputy director, J-3, United States European Command in Stuttgart, Germany, on July 15, 1992. During this tour of duty, he was reassigned as chief of staff, Joint Task Force Provide Promise, for operations in Bosnia and Herzegovina and North Macedonia.

Returning to the United States, Jones was advanced to the rank of major general in July 1994 and was assigned as commanding general, 2nd Marine Division, Marine Forces Atlantic, Marine Corps Base Camp Lejeune. Jones next served as director, Expeditionary Warfare Division (N85), Office of the Chief of Naval Operations, during 1996, then as the deputy chief of staff for plans, policies, and operations, Headquarters Marine Corps, Washington, D.C. He was advanced to lieutenant general on July 18, 1996. His next assignment was as the military assistant to the Secretary of Defense.

Commandant

On April 21, 1999, Jones was nominated for appointment to the grade of general and assignment as the 32nd Commandant of the Marine Corps. He was promoted to general on June 30, 1999, and assumed the post on July 1, 1999. He served as commandant until January 2003, turning over the reins to General Michael Hagee.

Among other innovations during his tenure as Marine Corps commandant, Jones oversaw the Marine Corps' development of MARPAT camouflage uniforms, and the adoption of the Marine Corps Martial Arts Program. These replaced M81 Woodland uniforms and the LINE combat system, respectively.

Supreme Allied Commander Europe
Jones assumed duties as the commander of United States European Command (EUCOM) on January 16, 2003, and Supreme Allied Commander Europe (SACEUR) the following day. He was the first Marine Corps general to serve as SACEUR/EUCOM commander.

The Marine Corps had only recently begun to take on a larger share of high-level assignments in the Department of Defense. In December 2006, Jones was one of five serving Marine Corps four-star general officers who outranked the Commandant of the Marine Corps, General James T. Conway in terms of seniority and time in grade—the others being Chairman of the Joint Chiefs of Staff General Peter Pace; former commandant General Michael Hagee; commander of United States Strategic Command General James E. Cartwright; and Assistant Commandant General Robert Magnus.

As SACEUR, Jones led the Allied Command Operations (ACO), comprising NATO's military forces in Europe, from the Supreme Headquarters Allied Powers Europe in Mons, Belgium. Jones relinquished command as SACEUR on December 7, 2006, and was succeeded by United States Army General John Craddock. Jones was reported to have declined an opportunity to succeed General John P. Abizaid as commander of United States Central Command. He retired from the Marine Corps on February 1, 2007.

Awards and decorations
Jones' personal decorations include (Foreign and non-U.S. personal and unit decorations are in order of precedence based on military guidelines and award date):

Other recognition
In 2000, Jones received the Golden Plate Award of the American Academy of Achievement.

Post-military career

Business roles
Following his retirement from the military, Jones became president of the Institute for 21st Century Energy, an affiliate of the US Chamber of Commerce; he also served as chair of the board of directors of the Atlantic Council of the United States from June 2007 until January 2009, when he assumed the post of National Security Advisor.  Jones also served as a member of the guiding coalition for the Project on National Security Reform, as well as chairman of the Independent Commission on the Iraqi Security Forces. He was a member of the board of directors of The Boeing Company from June 21, 2007, to December 15, 2008, serving on the company's Audit and Finance Committees. Jones was also a member of the board of directors of Cross Match Technologies, a privately held biometric solutions company, from October 2007 to January 2009.

Jones was employed on the board of trustees of the Center for Strategic and International Studies (CSIS), a bipartisan think-tank, from 2007 to 2008, and then began serving again in 2011. He was a member of the board of directors of Chevron Corporation from May 28, 2008 to December 5, 2008, serving on the Board Nominating and Governance and Public Policy Committees.
According to the first report since Jones re-entered government service in January 2009, Jones earned a salary and bonus of $900,000 from the US Chamber, as well as director fees of $330,000 from the Boeing Company and $290,000 from the Chevron Corporation.

After leaving the Obama administration, Jones returned as a Fellow at the US Chamber in 2011.

The board of directors of General Dynamics has elected Jones to be a director of the corporation, effective August 3, 2011. Also, on January 13, 2012, Jones joined Deloitte Consulting LLP as a senior adviser who will work with Federal and commercial consulting clients within Deloitte's Department of Defense and Intel segments. In early 2013, Jones joined OxiCool Inc's Advisory Board.

Jones established the consulting firms Ironhand Security LLC and Jones Group International LLC. The firms have worked for foreign governments, including Saudi Arabia. After the murder of Jamal Khashoggi by the Saudi regime, Jones downplayed his firms' work with the Saudi government and said that the remaining contract with them was about to expire. However, Jones's firms subsequently expanded its partnership with the Saudi regime. By 2022, his firms had four contracts with the Saudi government and employed 53 Americans in Riyadh, eight of whom were retired generals and admirals.

Diplomatic roles
Secretary of State Condoleezza Rice asked Jones twice to be Deputy Secretary of State after Robert Zoellick resigned. He declined.

On May 25, 2007, Congress created an Independent Commission on the Security Forces of Iraq to investigate for 120 days the capabilities of the Iraq armed forces and police. Jones served as chairman of that commission and reported on Congress on September 6, 2007, noting serious deficiencies in the Iraq Interior Ministry and in the Iraq National Police.

Rice appointed Jones as a special envoy for Middle East security on November 28, 2007, to work with both Israelis and Palestinians on security issues.

Jones serves as a Senior Fellow at the Bipartisan Policy Center (BPC), where he works on a variety of national security and energy-related issues. Jones is also a co-chair of BPC's Energy Project.

Jones is an Advisory Board Member of Spirit of America, a 501(c)(3) organization that supports the safety and success of Americans serving abroad and the local people and partners they seek to help.

National Security Advisor

On December 1, 2008, President-elect Obama announced Jones as his selection for National Security Advisor.  The National Security Advisor is appointed by the president without confirmation by the United States Senate.

The selection surprised people because, as Michael Crowley reported, "The two men didn't meet until Obama's foreign policy aide, Mark Lippert, arranged a 2005 sit-down, and, as of this October, Jones had only spoken to Obama twice". Crowley speculated that Jones' record suggests he is "someone who, unencumbered by strong ideological leanings, can evaluate ideas dispassionately whether they come from left or right", and, "This is probably why Obama picked him". Jones was also picked because he is well respected and likely to possess the skills to navigate the other prestigious and powerful cabinet members.

Though he did not know Gates especially well, both men shared long experience in the national security establishment (Gates was in the Air Force and previously headed the CIA). Jones and Clinton had a more direct connection from her tenure on the Senate Armed Services Committee. The two were said to have particularly clicked at a 2005 conference on security policy in Munich. Jones hosted a small private dinner that included Clinton and South Carolina Republican Senator Lindsey Graham, among others; at the end of the convivial evening, according to one person present, Jones followed Clinton out to her car to visit in private.

Jones assumed the post when Obama was sworn into office on January 20, 2009. He announced his resignation as National Security Advisor on October 8, 2010, and was succeeded by Thomas E. Donilon.

Advocate for Iranian dissidents
In March 2013, Jones was quoted comparing the conditions for Iranians in a US camp in Iraq with the conditions of detention for captives held in the Guantanamo Bay detention camps. While addressing the Iranian American Cultural Society of Michigan, Jones said Guantanamo captives "are treated far better" than the Iranian internees. Jones criticized other aspects of the Obama administration's policy on Iran. Foreign Policy magazine noted that Jones had not volunteered whether he had been paid for this speaking engagement.

Personal life
Former Secretary of Defense William Cohen, who hired Jones as his military assistant, said that Jones has a placid demeanor and a "methodical approach to problems—he's able to view issues at both the strategic and tactical level".

Jones was also responsible for convincing country music artist Toby Keith that he should record and publish his popular concert hit "Courtesy of the Red, White, & Blue (The Angry American)".

See also
 James L. Jones Sr., decorated World War II Marine Corps officer, father of General James L. Jones Jr.
 William K. Jones, decorated Marine Corps lieutenant general, served in combat in three wars; uncle of General James L. Jones

Citations

General references

Attribution

External links

 
 
 
 

|-

|-

|-

1943 births
United States Marine Corps personnel of the Vietnam War
Walsh School of Foreign Service alumni
Georgetown Hoyas men's basketball players
Joint Chiefs of Staff
Living people
National War College alumni
NATO Supreme Allied Commanders
Obama administration personnel
People from Kansas City, Missouri
United States Marine Corps Commandants
United States Marine Corps generals
United States National Security Advisors

Commander's Grand Crosses of the Order of the Lithuanian Grand Duke Gediminas
Commandeurs of the Légion d'honneur
Grand Crosses of the Order of Aviz
Grand Crosses with Star and Sash of the Order of Merit of the Federal Republic of Germany
Officers of the Ordre national du Mérite
Recipients of the Defense Distinguished Service Medal
Recipients of the Gallantry Cross (Vietnam)
Recipients of the Legion of Merit
Recipients of the Meritorious Service Decoration
Recipients of the Military Order of the Cross of the Eagle, Class I
Recipients of the NATO Meritorious Service Medal
Recipients of the Silver Star
Recipients of the National Intelligence Distinguished Service Medal
Bipartisan Policy Center
American men's basketball players
Atlantic Council
Recipients of the Humanitarian Service Medal